Sanderson House may refer to:

John Sanderson House, Waltham, Massachusetts
Nathan Sanderson I House, Waltham, Massachusetts
Nathan Sanderson II House, Waltham, Massachusetts
Hagar–Smith–Livermore–Sanderson House, Waltham, Massachusetts
Sanderson–Clark Farmhouse, Waltham, Massachusetts
Sanderson House (Scottholm Terrace, Syracuse, New York), at 112 Scottholm Terrace
Sanderson House (Scottholm Boulevard, Syracuse, New York), at 301 Scottholm Boulevard
Sanderson House (Pollocksville, North Carolina)
Nielsen-Sanderson House, Draper, Utah